Jieyu Township is a township in Yuanqu County, Shanxi, China. , it administers Leyao Village, Yuanzhong Village, and Jieyu Village.

References 

Township-level divisions of Shanxi
Yuanqu County